Rodrigo Archubi (born 6 June 1985 in Remedios de Escalada) is an Argentine football winger, who last played for Sportivo Dock Sud.

Career
Archubi of Greek origin began his playing career in 2003 with Club Atlético Lanús. He made his debut in a 0–1 home defeat to Arsenal de Sarandí on 29 June 2003. He made his international club debut for the club in the 2006 Copa Sudamericana where he scored 4 goals in 6 appearances.

In 2007, he joined Greek side as a major signing, Olympiacos however he did not settle in his country of origin and returned to Argentina in January 2008 to play for River Plate. He won the Greek Super Cup in October 2007.

He made his Copa Libertadores debut in 2008 for River Plate and was part of the squad that won the Clausura 2008 tournament.

Following a 2–2 draw with Gimnasia y Esgrima de La Plata, Archubi failed a doping test which could have resulted in a 2-year ban from football, but he received only a 3-month suspension beginning in January 2010 as he was found to have taken "recreational drugs" (cannabis) rather than "medically prohibited drugs". Archubi was subsequently released by River Plate.

In 2011, Archubi started training in Esporte Clube Juventude, from Caxias do Sul, Brazil.

In August 2011, Archubi sign to Kuwaiti Premier League side Kazma for £500.000 for one season, he performed very well with Kazma, however had difficulty adopting to the heat and culture in Kuwait.

In 2012, he joined Argentine side Boca Unidos club from Corrientes Province.

Youth international

In 2005 Archubi was part of the Argentina Under-20 team that won the FIFA World Youth Championship.

Titles

References

External links

Guardian statistics
 Argentine Primera statistics

1985 births
Living people
Sportspeople from Lanús
Argentine people of Greek descent
Argentine footballers
Argentine expatriate footballers
Club Atlético Lanús footballers
Olympiacos F.C. players
Club Atlético River Plate footballers
Esporte Clube Juventude players
Kazma SC players
Boca Unidos footballers
Sportivo Italiano footballers
Deportes La Serena footballers
Argentine Primera División players
Primera B de Chile players
Super League Greece players
Association football midfielders
Expatriate footballers in Chile
Expatriate footballers in Greece
Expatriate footballers in Brazil
Expatriate footballers in Kuwait
Argentine expatriate sportspeople in Greece
Argentina under-20 international footballers
Kuwait Premier League players
Argentine expatriate sportspeople in Kuwait
Argentine expatriate sportspeople in Chile
Argentine expatriate sportspeople in Brazil
Doping cases in association football